Age of Wonders: Shadow Magic is a turn-based strategy video game in a fantasy setting. Shadow Magic is the third incarnation of the Age of Wonders series, and is a direct sequel to Age of Wonders II: The Wizard's Throne. All three games were developed by Triumph Studios. The series is the spiritual successor to Master of Magic.

Gameplay

The game features a world on three different levels, the Surface, the Underground and the Shadow World. Scenarios may take place on one or more of these levels. The game can either be played in a simultaneous mode, wherein players move their units at the same time during a turn, and in a traditional turn based mode.  The game is played both in an overworld mode, on which parties are moved and raised, structures are built and heroes are contracted, as well as a battle mode.

The key element of the game are the Wizards. Wizards are very powerful at magic, but rather weak at close combat. Every player has one Wizard, each with a sphere of magic (Life, Death, Fire, Water, Air, Earth, Cosmos and finally Chaos/Secret), which decides which spells the Wizard can research. Some Wizards have multiple spheres, but can only learn less advanced spells. Spells range from passive spells (for instance, blessing a unit with additional strengths), to direct spells (i.e. healing spells or attack spells), to summoning spells. Wizards are the only units in the game who can't level up or gain medals. Instead, they improve by researching new spells and skills.

Wizards have a domain, the area in which spells can be cast represented by hexagons. When a wizard is inside a wizard's tower, the radius of his domain is increased by several hexagons, and in addition a small domain is radiated around each hero. Every village, town and city can build a Wizard Tower. The Wizard only has to be inside one Wizard Tower; the other towers will also increase his domain.

Wizards can also attract heroes. Heroes are the men and women who lead troops into battle. Heroes, unlike Wizards, can level up. When they level up, the player can choose between three abilities for the hero to make them stronger. For example, they can fire at range or improve the party morale.

Regular units represent the majority of the units in the game. These units can be divided in four levels, based on the various buildings that are needed for creating them. Units can also be awarded medals, which are given independent of respective levels. The medals represent experience and give bonuses to unit statistics.

There are many kinds of structures on the World Map. The most important ones are the cities and the structures that generate either gold or mana. Cities come in four levels. The lowest level is the Outpost, which can only construct a Wooden Wall and the race's basic unit. The next stage, the Village, can build many more buildings. The other stages are Town and City. The stages differ in how fast they can build, and the income they generate.

There are fifteen races in the game, which fall into three main categories: light, twilight, and darkness. These categories can be further broken down into five groups; pure good, good, evil, pure evil and neutral races.

Multiplayer
Like both its predecessors the game was designed for single-player as well as multiplayer, and while the graphic engine is the same as in Age of Wonders 2: The Wizard's Throne, gameplay is improved and some important features are added. While every existing race in the game received at least one new recruitable unit and new buildings, 3 races are completely new. Much requested from the fans (and referred to in the forums as the "random map cult"), the game now offers a "Create Random Scenario" option. Age of Wonders: Shadow Magic can be played in multiplayer mode 3 different ways; 1) Joining via I.P (Internet Protocol) address; 2) Joining via LAN (Local Area Network) connection; 3) Play by Email.

Development
Shadow Magic was probably planned as an expansion pack for Age of Wonders II: The Wizard's Throne, but was published as a stand-alone game instead.

After the end of the official support with patch 1.3 the game was unofficially developed further by the fan-community via a community patch. A further update was later released.

Availability
Age of Wonders: Shadow Magic was out of print and was not made available online for several years (Abandonware). The entire franchise was re-released on Stardock's Impulse digital distribution service in September 2010, soon after via GOG.com and GamersGate and finally through Steam service.

Reception

The editors of Computer Gaming World presented Shadow Magic with their 2003 "Strategy Game of the Year" award. They wrote: "Of all the strategy games we played this year, Age of Wonders: Shadow Magic is the only one with the 'just one more turn' addictiveness that distinguishes the best of the best". It was a nominee for PC Gamer USs 2003 "Best Turn-Based Strategy Game" award, although it lost to Combat Mission: Afrika Korps.

References

External links
 Official website via Internet Archive
 Age of Wonders: Shadow Magic at Triumph Studios
 

2003 video games
4X video games
Fantasy video games
Gathering of Developers games
Multiplayer and single-player video games
Play-by-email video games
Turn-based strategy video games
Video game sequels
Video games with isometric graphics
Video games developed in the Netherlands
Windows games
Windows-only games